Anders Christensen Bording (21 January 1619 – 24 May 1677) was a Danish poet and journalist. He was born in Ribe. He is notable for his epigrams, ballads, occasional poems and epistles, as well as for publishing the first Danish newspaper, the monthly Den Danske Mercurius, written in verse entirely by him.

External links
 Biography of Anders Bording from the Archive of Danish Literature 
 Skjald: Anders Bording (1619-1677) 

1619 births
People from Ribe
1677 deaths
Danish male poets
17th-century Danish poets
17th-century male writers
17th-century journalists
Occasional poets